Tengers is a 2007 South African animated film written, directed and produced by Michael J. Rix. It is the first full-length animation produced in South Africa and uses the claymation technique.

The film is a satirical black comedy about life in post-Apartheid South Africa. Rix has said his intention was to make a film that was: "Entertaining but not frivolous. Political but not preachy. Sophisticated but not alienating."

Synopsis 
The film opens with Rob's mistaken arrest for bank robbery. He explains to Marius that he was wearing the balaclava because he was cold, and that carrying a gun is standard practice in Johannesburg. In fact, he was at the bank to see Christine.  She is the artist responsible for the "Remembrance Wall," a memorial to the victims of violent crime in the city. After meeting at the wall, Christine agrees to go on a date with Rob. After winning a fortune on a scratch card, Rob finds his life under threat and believes that the Lottery Service is trying to murder him to prevent him from claiming his prize. He is forced to hide amongst the city's underclass. The film ends with a western style shoot out during which the killer is revealed to be Marius and Christine is killed. Rob reflects on the harsh realities of life in modern South Africa.

Characters
Rob, an unemployed writer, working on the "great South African novel".
Marius, Rob's friend, struggling to make ends meet on a meagre cop's salary.
Christine, a bank teller and artist. She is also the girl of Rob's dreams.

Minor characters
Minor characters include: Vusi, a taxi driver; Jack, a professional carjacker; and Fud, a homeless beggar.

Notes
Rix shot the film over the course of nine years in Johannesburg.
The term Tengers was coined by Rix himself to refer to residents of Gauteng province.

See also
List of animated feature-length films
List of stop-motion films

References

External links

Review by SAMovieMag

2007 films
Apartheid films
Clay animation films
South African animated films
2007 comedy-drama films
2000s stop-motion animated films
South African comedy-drama films
2000s English-language films